Drew Miller may refer to:

 Drew Miller (born 1984), American ice hockey player
 Drew Miller (offensive lineman) (born 1985), American football player
 Drew Miller (quarterback) (born 1978), American football player